Steve O. may refer to:

 Steve-O (born Stephen Gilchrist Glover, 1974), stunt performer and television personality, most famous for Jackass
 Dr. Steve-O (2007 TV series), TV show starring Stephen Gilchrist Glover
 Steve Oedekerk (born 1961), American actor, comedian and filmmaker
 Steve Olsonoski (born 1953), American professional wrestler under the stage name Steve O
 Steve-O, disc jockey at station KISO

See also
 Stevo (disambiguation)
 Stephen (disambiguation)
 O (disambiguation)